The Thunderbird Lodge is a historic motel in Chinle, Arizona. The only lodging facility within Canyon de Chelly National Monument, a national monument established in 1931, it has grown out of an old trading post built in 1896, the Thunderbird Lodge Trading Post. Some elements use Pueblo Revival architecture.

Bibliography 
 Laura Soullière Harrison and Beverley B. Spears, « Historic Structure Report: Thunderbird Lodge », Southwest Cultural Resources Center Professional Papers, n°17, 1989.
 Peter J. McKenna and Scott E. Travis, « Archeological Investigations at Thunderbird Lodge », Southwest Cultural Resources Center Professional Papers, n°20, 1989.

External links 

Official website

Motels in the United States
Hotels in Arizona
Trading posts in the United States
Buildings and structures in Apache County, Arizona
Pueblo Revival architecture in Arizona